Trinity Methodist Church, Castleford is located in Castleford, Wakefield District, West Yorkshire, England.

The church is part of the Aire and Calder Methodist Circuit in the Yorkshire West District.

The current Johannus Sweelinck 30 3-manual digital organ was installed in the church in the year 2000. The original organ was built by Nelson & Co., based in Durham.

The church has been re-roofed. The Castleford Male Voice Choir meet in the church hall next to the church on a weekly basis.

References

External links

 Trinity Methodist Church, Castleford website
 Trinity Methodist Church, Castleford at the National Archives (UK)

1964 establishments in England
Churches completed in 1964
Methodist churches in West Yorkshire
Churches in Castleford, West Yorkshire